The following is the 2004–05 network television schedule for the six major English language commercial broadcast networks in the United States. The schedule covers primetime hours from September 2004 through August 2005. The schedule is followed by a list per network of returning series, new series, and series cancelled after the 2003–04 season. All times are Eastern and Pacific, with certain exceptions, such as Monday Night Football.

Beginning this season, the major networks were no longer producing original dramatic content for Saturday broadcast (an exception being ABC's The Wonderful World of Disney, although it often featured rebroadcast material). Saturday schedules consisted instead of nonfiction reality-based programming and rebroadcasts of dramatic series episodes from earlier in the week, or new episodes of series previously scheduled on other nights that had been de facto cancelled and were "burning off" unaired episodes.

New series are highlighted in bold.

Each of the 30 highest-rated shows is listed with its rank and rating as determined by Nielsen Media Research.

 Yellow indicates the top ten most watched programs of the season.
 Cyan indicates the top 20 most watched programs of the season.
 Magenta indicates the top 30 most watched programs of the season.
Other Legend
 Light blue indicates local programming.
 Gray indicates encore programming.
 Blue-gray indicates news programming.
 Light green indicates sporting events.
 Light Purple indicates movies. 
 Red indicates series being burned off and other scheduled programs, including specials.

Rankings determined by Nielsen Media Research.

PBS is not included; member stations have local flexibility over most of their schedules and broadcast times for network shows may vary.

Sunday

Monday

NOTE: On Fox, Athens was supposed to have started the night at 8–9 at mid-season, but it was cancelled at the last minute.

Tuesday

NOTES: On NBC, Average Joe was supposed to have started the night at 8–9, but it was delayed to summer, and The Contender was supposed to premiere in the timeslot on March 1, 2005, but it was delayed to March 9, 2005, before switching places with American Dreams and landed on its Sunday slot. On Fox, The Jury was supposed to have stayed on the night prior to November, but low ratings canned the show.

Wednesday

NOTE: On Fox, Method & Red was supposed to have stayed at 9:30-10, but it was cancelled at the last minute due to low ratings of the show from last season and at midseason, Life on a Stick would've been aired at 8:30-9, and The Bernie Mac Show would've been concluded the night at 9:30-10, but it was changed at a last minute.

Thursday

NOTE: On Fox, Tru Calling would've supposed to have stayed at 9-10, but it was pushed up to spring and place North Shore at fall instead.

Friday

NOTES: On Fox, The Jury was supposed to have remained on Fridays, and that The Next Great Champ was supposed to have started the night at 8–9, but due to low ratings of The Jury, it was cancelled, and The Complex: Malibu was signed on at the last minute, and at midseason, The Inside would've started the night at 8–9, followed by Jonny Zero. On The WB, Commando Nanny would've been aired at 9:30-10, but it was cancelled due to production difficulties.

Saturday

By network

ABC

Returning series
20/20
8 Simple Rules
According to Jim
Alias
America's Funniest Home Videos
The Bachelor
The Bachelorette
Extreme Makeover
Extreme Makeover: Home Edition
George Lopez
Hope & Faith
Less than Perfect
Monday Night Football
My Wife and Kids
NYPD Blue
Primetime Live
The Wonderful World of Disney

New series
ABC Saturday Movie of the Week
The Benefactor
Blind Justice *
Boston Legal
Brat Camp *
Complete Savages
Dancing with the Stars *
Desperate Housewives
Eyes *
Grey's Anatomy *
Jake in Progress *
Life as We Know It
Life of Luxury *
Lost
My Kind of Town *
Rodney
The Scholar *
Supernanny *
Wife Swap

Not returning from 2003–04:
10-8: Officers on Duty
The Big House
The D.A.
The Drew Carey Show
I'm With Her
It's All Relative
Karen Sisco
Kingdom Hospital
Line of Fire
Married to the Kellys
NHL on ABC (returned for 2021–22)
The Practice
Threat Matrix
The Ultimate Love Test

CBS

Returning series
48 Hours
60 Minutes
The Amazing Race
Big Brother
Cold Case
CBS Sunday Movie
CSI: Crime Scene Investigation
CSI: Miami
Everybody Loves Raymond
JAG
Joan of Arcadia
Judging Amy
The King of Queens
National Treasure
NCIS
Still Standing
Survivor
Two and a Half Men
Without a Trace
Yes, Dear

New series
Center of the Universe
Clubhouse
Crimetime Saturday
CSI: NY
The Cut *
Dr. Vegas
Fire Me...Please *
Listen Up!
Numb3rs
Rock Star *
Wickedly Perfect *
The Will *

Not returning from 2003–04:
Becker
The Brotherhood of Poland, New Hampshire
Century City
The District
The Guardian
Hack
The Handler
Star Search
The Stones

Fox

Returning series
24
America's Most Wanted
American Idol
Arrested Development
The Bernie Mac Show
Cops
Family Guy
Futurama
King of the Hill
Malcolm in the Middle
The O.C.
The Simple Life
The Simpsons
That '70s Show
The Swan
Totally Outrageous Behavior
Tru Calling

New series
American Dad! *
The Complex: Malibu *
Hell's Kitchen *
House
The Inside *
Jonny Zero *
Life on a Stick *
My Big Fat Obnoxious Boss
Nanny 911
The Next Great Champ *
North Shore *
Quintuplets
Point Pleasant *
The Princes of Malibu *
The Rebel Billionaire: Branson's Quest for the Best
Renovate My Family *
The Sketch Show *
So You Think You Can Dance *
Stacked *
Trading Spouses (Moved To ABC)
Who's Your Daddy? *
World's Craziest Videos *

Not returning from 2003–04:
A Minute with Stan Hooper
American Juniors
Boston Public
Cracking Up
Forever Eden
Joe Millionaire (revived and returned for 2021–22)
Luis
Method & Red
My Big Fat Obnoxious Fiance
Oliver Beene
Skin (returned to Soapnet in 2005)
Wonderfalls

NBC

Returning series
American Dreams
The Apprentice
Crossing Jordan
Dateline NBC
ER
Fear Factor
Las Vegas
Last Comic Standing
Law & Order
Law & Order: Criminal Intent
Law & Order: Special Victims Unit
Scrubs
Third Watch
The West Wing
Will & Grace

New series
$25 Million Dollar Hoax *
The Biggest Loser
Committed *
The Contender *
Father of the Pride
Hawaii
Hit Me Baby, One More Time *
Joey
Law & Order: Trial by Jury *
The Law Firm *
LAX
Medical Investigation
Medium *
Meet Mister Mom *
Most Outrageous Moments *
The Office *
Revelations *
Sports Illustrated Swimsuit Model Search *
Tommy Lee Goes to College *
I Want To Be a Hilton *

Not returning from 2003–04:
Average Joe
Boomtown
Come to Papa
Coupling
Crime & Punishment
Ed
Frasier (revived by Paramount+ in 2022)
Friends (returned on HBO Max in 2021)
Good Morning Miami
Happy Family
The Lyon's Den
Miss Match
The Restaurant
The Tracy Morgan Show
Whoopi

UPN

Returning series
All of Us
America's Next Top Model
Eve
Girlfriends
Half & Half
One on One
Star Trek: Enterprise
UPN's Night at the Movies
WWE SmackDown

New series
The Bad Girl's Guide *
Britney and Kevin: Chaotic *
Cuts *
Kevin Hill
The Road to Stardom with Missy Elliott *
R U the Girl with T-Boz & Chilli. *
Second Time Around
Veronica Mars

Not returning from 2003–04:
Amish in the City
Game Over
Jake 2.0
The Mullets
The Parkers
The Player
Rock Me Baby

The WB

Returning series
7th Heaven
Blue Collar TV
Charmed
Everwood
Flix From the Frog
Gilmore Girls
Grounded for Life
High School Reunion
One Tree Hill
Reba
Smallville
Steve Harvey's Big Time
Summerland
The WB Thursday Night Movie
What I Like About You

New series
Big Man on Campus
Drew Carey's Green Screen Show *
Jack & Bobby
Living With Fran
The Mountain
The Starlet *

Not returning from 2003–04:
All About the Andersons
Angel
The Help
The Jamie Kennedy Experiment
Like Family
Run of the House
The Surreal Life
Tarzan

Note: The * indicates that the program was introduced in midseason.

References

United States primetime network television schedules
United States Network Television Schedule, 2004-05
United States Network Television Schedule, 2004-05